Myxicola is a genus of polychaetes belonging to the family Sabellidae.

The genus has almost cosmopolitan distribution.

Species:

Myxicola aesthetica 
Myxicola fauveli 
Myxicola infundibulum 
Myxicola nana 
Myxicola ommatophora 
Myxicola sarsi 
Myxicola sulcata 
Myxicola violacea

References

Sabellida
Annelid genera